The 2017 WGC-Bridgestone Invitational was a professional golf tournament held August  on the South Course of Firestone Country Club in Akron, Ohio. It was the 19th WGC-Bridgestone Invitational tournament, and the third of the World Golf Championships events in 2017.

Hideki Matsuyama won the tournament.

Venue

Course layout
The South Course was designed by Bert Way and redesigned by Robert Trent Jones in 1960.

Field
The field consisted of players drawn primarily from the Official World Golf Ranking and the winners of the worldwide tournaments with the strongest fields.

1. Playing members of the 2016 United States and European Ryder Cup teams.
Rafa Cabrera-Bello (2,3,4), Matt Fitzpatrick (2,3,4), Rickie Fowler (2,3,4), Sergio García (2,3,4), J. B. Holmes, Dustin Johnson (2,3,4), Zach Johnson, Brooks Koepka (2,3,4), Matt Kuchar (2,3), Rory McIlroy (2,3,4), Phil Mickelson (2,3), Ryan Moore (2,3), Thomas Pieters (2,3), Patrick Reed (2,3,4), Justin Rose (2,3,4), Jordan Spieth (2,3,4), Henrik Stenson (2,3,4), Andy Sullivan, Jimmy Walker (2,3,4), Lee Westwood, Danny Willett (2,3), Chris Wood
Martin Kaymer did not play due to a shoulder injury.
Brandt Snedeker (2,3) did not play due to a rib injury.

2. The top 50 players from the Official World Golf Ranking as of July 24, 2017.
Daniel Berger (3,4), Wesley Bryan (3,4), Paul Casey (3), Kevin Chappell (3,4), Jason Day (3), Jason Dufner (3,4), Ross Fisher (3), Tommy Fleetwood (3,4), Branden Grace (3), Emiliano Grillo (3),  Bill Haas (3), Brian Harman (3,4), Tyrrell Hatton (3,4), Charley Hoffman (3), Billy Horschel (3,4), Kim Si-woo (3,4), Kevin Kisner (3,4), Russell Knox (3,4), Marc Leishman (3,4), Hideki Matsuyama (3,4), Francesco Molinari (3,4), Alex Norén (3,4), Louis Oosthuizen (3), Pat Perez (3,4), Jon Rahm (3,4), Charl Schwartzel (3), Adam Scott (3), Hideto Tanihara, Justin Thomas (3,4), Bubba Watson (3), Bernd Wiesberger (3), Gary Woodland (3)

3. The top 50 players from the Official World Golf Ranking as of July 31, 2017.
Jhonattan Vegas (4)

4. Tournament winners, whose victories are considered official, of tournaments from the Federation Tours since the prior season's Bridgestone Invitational with an Official World Golf Ranking Strength of Field Rating of 115 points or more.'Sam Brazel, Bryson DeChambeau, Adam Hadwin, Russell Henley, Mackenzie Hughes, Thongchai Jaidee, Thorbjørn Olesen, Rod Pampling, Renato Paratore, Andrés Romero, Xander Schauffele, Kyle Stanley, Brendan Steele, Hudson Swafford, Wang Jeung-hun, Fabrizio Zanotti

5. The winner of selected tournaments from each of the following tours
Asian Tour: 2016 Order of Merit winner – Scott Hend
PGA Tour of Australasia: Australian PGA Championship (2016) – Harold Varner III
Japan Golf Tour: Bridgestone Open (2016) – Satoshi Kodaira
Japan Golf Tour: Japan Golf Tour Championship – Shaun Norris
Sunshine Tour: Dimension Data Pro-Am – Paul Lawrie

Nationalities in the field 

 
Past champions in the field

Round summaries
First roundThursday, August 3, 2017 
Second roundFriday, August 4, 2017Third roundSaturday, August 5, 2017Final roundSunday, August 6, 2017Source:

ScorecardFinal roundCumulative tournament scores, relative to par''

Source:

References

External links

Coverage on European Tour's official site
Firestone Country Club site

WGC Invitational
WGC-Bridgestone Invitational
WGC-Bridgestone Invitational
WGC-Bridgestone Invitational
WGC-Bridgestone Invitational